Mountaintops is an album by Mates of State released through Barsuk on September 13, 2011.

Reception
According to aggregator website Metacritic, Mountaintops received generally favorable reviews from critics.
Spin gave the album a 7/10, writing, "Mountaintops has plenty of upbeat romps, but the most compelling moments are the epic, minor-key laments 'At Least I Have You' and 'Unless I'm Led,' which argue that even the truest of loves can still feel lonely and miserable."

  Paste placed it at number 49 on their "Top 50 Albums of 2011" list.

Robert Christgau gave it an A- and wrote that "the wholeness of the music leaves us feeling they're more than OK."
The song "Palomino" was featured in a 15-second Ice Breakers commercial where a man and a woman share a cab in a rainy night.

Track listing
"Palomino"
"Maracas"
"Sway"
"Unless I'm Led"
"Total Serendipity"
"Basement Money"
"At Least I Have You"
"Desire"
"Change"
"Mistakes"

References

 

2011 albums
Mates of State albums
Barsuk Records albums